Wang Quanze (born June 8, 2000), known as Michael Wang, is a Chinese basketball player for the Guangzhou Loong Lions of the Chinese Basketball Association (CBA). He was a member of the China national under-19 team in 2018, and played college basketball for the Penn Quakers of the Ivy League.

Early life
Wang was born in Taiyuan, Shanxi, but spent part of his childhood in Beijing, where he played basketball at Beijing No. 4 Junior High School.

High school career
Wang moved to the United States at age 14. He enrolled at Mater Dei High School in Santa Ana, California and played power forward for the majority of his high school career. While in high school, he lived with teammate Spencer Freedman's family.

After graduating from high school, Wang played in the Amateur Athletic Union in the summer of 2018.

College career
In 2018, Wang enrolled in the Wharton School at the University of Pennsylvania.
During his freshman year with the Quakers, Wang averaged 8.5 points and 3.6 rebounds per game. On December 4, 2018, Wang scored a career-high 23 points off the bench in an 89–75 upset win over Miami. Wang missed the entirety of his sophomore season due to knee tendonitis.

National team career
Wang competed for the China national under-19 basketball team in the 2018 FIBA Under-18 Asian Championship. During the tournament, he averaged 20 points, 13 rebounds, 3.6 assists, and 1.3 steals per game en route to the team's third place finish. He led the tournament in rebounds and was selected in the team of the tournament.

Career statistics

College

|-
| style="text-align:left;"| 2018–19
| style="text-align:left;"| Penn
| 26 || 9 || 18.1 || .455 || .310 || .708 || 3.6 || 1.1 || .5 || .2 || 8.5

References

External links
Penn Quakers bio

2000 births
Living people
Basketball players from Shanxi
Chinese expatriate basketball people in the United States
Chinese men's basketball players
Penn Quakers men's basketball players
People from Taiyuan
Power forwards (basketball)
People from Santa Ana, California